FNR may refer to:

Science and medicine 
 False negative rate
 Agency for Renewable Resources, in Germany
 Fast-neutron reactor
 Ferredoxin—NADP(+) reductase
 FNR regulon
 Ford Nuclear Reactor at the University of Michigan

Transport 
 Farid Nagar railway station, Pakistan, station code
 Farningham Road railway station, England, station code
 Fung Nin Road stop, Hong Kong, station code
 Funter Bay Seaplane Base, Alaska, US, IATA code
 Namur railway station (Belgium), station code

Other uses 
 Frazer-Nash Research, UK R&D company